Curetis venata is a species of butterfly in the lycaenid subfamily Curetinae. It was described by Hans Fruhstorfer in 1908 as subspecies of Curetis insularis. 
Its type locality is on Sulawesi, Indonesia. Subspecies Curetis venata saleyerensis is known from Selayar Island.

Subspecies
Curetis venata has two known subspecies:

Notes and references

Curetis
Butterflies of Indonesia
Butterflies described in 1908